Klapp is a surname. Notable people with the surname include:

Elinor Klapp-Phipps Park, a park in Tallahassee, Florida
Eugene Klapp, early editor of House Beautiful

See also
Clapp, a surname
Knapp (surname)